Proto or PROTO may refer to:

Language 
 Proto-, an English prefix meaning "first"

Media 
Proto (magazine), an American science magazine
Radio Proto in Cyprus

Music 
 Proto (Holly Herndon album), 2019
 Proto (Leo O'Kelly album), 2002
 Proto (band), a progressive rock band from Memphis, Tennessee

Organizations 
 Proto (tools), a tool company (formerly Plomb Tools), now a division of Stanley Black & Decker
 Proto Motors, a South Korean sports car manufacturer and refitter
 Proto Records, a British record company active in the 1980s; see Barry Evangeli
 Proto (paintball), a paintball equipment manufacturing company

People 
 Non-fictional
 Frank Proto, American composer and bassist
 Ludovic Proto (born 1965), French boxer
 Neil Thomas Proto (born 1945), American lawyer, teacher, lecturer, and author
 Silvio Proto, Belgian goalkeeper
 Proto (see Protus and Hyacinth), Christian martyr during the persecution of Valerian I
 Fictional
 Proto, one of the Nereids in Greek mythology
 Proto (Ghost in the Shell), a fictional character in Masamune Shirow's Ghost in the Shell anime and manga
 Proto, a more advanced prototype of the prophetbot from the video game OneShot

Science and technology 
 Proto-, the prefix, as used in taxonomy.
 Siebe Gorman Proto, a type of rebreather breathing set
 SEAT Proto, concept cars
PROTO (fusion reactor)

See also 
 
 
 Protos (disambiguation)